Philippe Tisson (8 March 1903 – 2 January 1990) was a French freestyle swimmer. He competed in the men's 4 × 200 metre freestyle relay event at the 1928 Summer Olympics.

References

External links
 

1903 births
1990 deaths
French male freestyle swimmers
Olympic swimmers of France
Swimmers at the 1928 Summer Olympics
Place of birth missing